Davide Bertoncini (born 9 May 1991) is an Italian footballer who plays for  club Novara.

Biography
Born in Fiorenzuola d'Arda, Province of Piacenza, Emilia region, Bertoncini started his career at Piacenza. On 31 August 2009 Bertoncini left for Serie A club Genoa on a temporary deal. In June 2010 Genoa signed the defender on a co-ownership deal for €150,000. During the 2 years, Bertoncini was a member of Genoa's reserves; Bertoncini appeared once in 2010–11 Serie A as an unused substitute in January 2011 as number 31. In summer 2011 Bertoncini returned to Piacenza for their 2011–12 Lega Pro Prima Divisione campaign, as the club had been relegated from Serie B in 2011. Bertoncini also signed a three-year professional contract with Genoa on 1 September 2009, as a three-year professional contract could only be offered to players who graduate from the reserve (under-20 team) according to N.O.I.F. of FIGC. The club was declared bankrupt in mid-season. In June 2012 Genoa acquired Bertoncini outright from Piacenza for €550. Both clubs failed to agree a price and had to submit a bid to Lega Serie A to determine the ownership, eventually Genoa's €50 more than usual peppercorn bid of €500 won.

In July 2012 Bertoncini left for another third division club Frosinone on a temporary deal with an option to purchase half of the player's registration rights. In June 2013 Frosinone excised the option. Frosinone eventually advanced to Serie A, giving Bertoncini his only experience of top-tier football so far.

On 16 July 2019, he signed a 2-year contract with Serie C club Reggina.

On 30 September 2020, he joined Como on a two-year contract.

On 1 September 2022, Bertoncini signed a two-year contract with Novara.

References

External links
 AIC profile (data by football.it) 
 

1991 births
Living people
Italian footballers
Piacenza Calcio 1919 players
Genoa C.F.C. players
Frosinone Calcio players
Modena F.C. players
S.S.D. Lucchese 1905 players
Reggina 1914 players
Como 1907 players
Novara F.C. players
Serie A players
Serie B players
Serie C players
Association football midfielders
People from Fiorenzuola d'Arda
Footballers from Emilia-Romagna
Sportspeople from the Province of Piacenza